The following is a list of the 19 cantons of the Haute-Loire department, in France, following the French canton reorganisation which came into effect in March 2015:

 Aurec-sur-Loire
 Bas-en-Basset
 Boutières
 Brioude
 Deux Rivières et Vallées
 Emblavez-et-Meygal
 Gorges de l'Allier-Gévaudan
 Mézenc
 Monistrol-sur-Loire
 Pays de Lafayette
 Plateau du Haut-Velay granitique
 Le Puy-en-Velay-1
 Le Puy-en-Velay-2
 Le Puy-en-Velay-3
 Le Puy-en-Velay-4
 Saint-Paulien
 Sainte-Florine
 Velay volcanique
 Yssingeaux

References